Kulharia is a village in Koilwar Block, Bhojpur district in the Indian state of Bihar.  It is one of the biggest village with more than 10K+ population.

Demography

Geography 
Kulharia is located at 25°34'27.4"N 84°46'17.7"E.

Connectivity

The nearest railway station is Kulharia railway station (KUA) which is situated between Bihta and Arrah on the Patna-Mughalsarai railway section.

References

Villages in Bhojpur district, India